Twistable Turnable Man is a tribute album to Shel Silverstein.  It was released in 2010 by Sugar Hill Records.

Most of the tracks feature Chip Young on acoustic guitar.

Track listing

References

2010 albums
Tribute albums
Sugar Hill Records compilation albums